The 1983–84 NCAA Division III men's ice hockey season began in November 1983 and concluded on March 23 of the following year. This was the 11th season of Division III college ice hockey.

This was the first season in which the NCAA held a national tournament for the Division III level.

The majority of programs that had been playing at the Division II level came from Division III schools but with the institution of the new championship all of the Division III schools were able to drop down to their normal level. Additionally, with an NCAA-sponsored tournament for Division III schools, most NAIA teams switched to NCAA classification and, with the NAIA Ice Hockey Championship becoming a superfluous tournament, the NAIA ended its sponsorship of ice hockey in 1984.

Because only one Division III tournament existed at the time and it permitted its Division II members to participate in the conference tournament no automatic bids could be offered to conference tournament champions. The NCAA continued to refrain from offering automatic bids until 2000.

Regular season

Standings

1984 NCAA tournament

Note: * denotes overtime period(s)

See also
 1983–84 NCAA Division I men's ice hockey season
 1983–84 NCAA Division II men's ice hockey season

References

External links

 
NCAA